The Roller Hockey Rankings are rankings of national teams and clubs of this sport.

Men's national teams ranking
The unofficial national teams ranking is calculated by the Elo rating system.

This is the ranking as of 14 July 2019.

Women's national teams ranking
As the men's ranking, the unofficial women's ranking is also calculated by using the Elo rating system.

This is the ranking updated as of 14 July 2019.

World Skate Europe league ranking
The coefficients of the league ranking take into account the performance of each association's representative teams in European competitions between the past four seasons. The coefficient is calculated by dividing the total of points accumulated by the number of participating teams and serves for determine the number of teams for each country in the Euroleague.

This is the ranking as of the end of the 2018–19 season.

World Skate Europe men's club ranking
The men's club ranking is made by the World Skate Europe for their club competitions. It is determined by the results of the clubs in the Euroleague, World Skate Europe Cup and the Continental Cup over the past four seasons.

This table shows the top 20 as of the end of the 2018–19 season.

World Skate Europe women's club ranking
The women's club ranking is also made by the World Skate Europe for their club competitions. It is determined by the results of the clubs in the Female League over the past four seasons.

This table shows the top 10 as of the end of the 2018–19 season.

Notes and references

External links
World Skate Europe Rink Hockey (official website)
RinkHockey.net

Rink hockey
Rink hockey